This article is about the period of modern democratic era of Mongolia since its democratic revolution of 1990.

1990 Democratic revolution's foundation
With the changes taking place internationally in the communist world, in particular in the Soviet Union, which had sheltered and led Mongolia; young people in Mongolia wanted to make a change in the society and the way the government was running its business. In addition, Mongolia suffered economic hardships from as early as the 1980s. The young people began to meet secretly and discuss it. For example, during his studies in the USSR, Tsakhiagiin Elbegdorj learned about Glasnost, the concepts such as freedom of speech and economic liberties. After returning to Mongolia, he met other like-minded people and tried to present those ideas to a wider audience, despite attempts of repression from the Politburo-authority of the government, and threats by his employer to lose his job.

In October 1989, New Generation, an underground resistance movement was formed.

On 28 November 1989, at the end of a speech at the Young Artists' Second National Congress, Elbegdorj said that Mongolia needed democracy and appealed for youth to collaborate to create democracy in Mongolia. He told the audience "We consider that Perestroika is a timely and brave step. Youth's contribution to this revolutionary matter is not by supportive talks but by certain work. Our contribution is our objectives to be fulfilled. Our objectives are: ... following democracy and transparency and contributing to glasnost, ... and supporting fair progressive power ... These are the objectives of an initiatives' group-an organization that shall work. After the congress I hope we will gather and discuss with you about it in this (newly forming group). The organization shall be based on public, voluntary and democratic principles."

The chairman of the congress stopped Elbegdorj's speech and warned him not to say such things. It was 1989 and Mongolia had been a communist country for 68 years. At that time, it was alleged that every other person was an unofficial communist party spy who would report people who expressed opinions other than socialism and communism. During the break of the congress, two young individuals met Elbegdorj and the three agreed to found a democratic movement and to secretly spread the news to other young people. Later the three met and united with ten other individuals and they are known as the Thirteen Leaders of Mongolia's Democratic Revolution. On his return from the congress, his boss at the newspaper Ulaan Od warned Elbegdorj that he would be fired if he participated further in any activities out of work or engaged in any conduct inconsistent with communist and socialist ideology. Despite the warning, Elbegdorj and his friends met secretly with other young people in the circle auditorium of the National University of Mongolia and discussed democracy, free market economic policy, and other prohibited subjects of the time, and began to draft a plan to organize a democratic movement. They met many times and brought new friends and new supporters to join them secretly. One night they placed ads of their open demonstration in streets.

On 9 December, people from New Generation met students, journalists and others to set up an open organization calling for drastic reform. The group called itself Mongolian Democratic Union.

Democratic revolution
On the morning of 10 December 1989, the first open pro-democracy demonstration met in front of the Youth Cultural Center in Ulaanbaatar. There, Elbegdorj announced the creation of the Mongolian Democratic Union (MDU). At the demonstration, the MDU founders publicly petitioned the government for a real implementation of Perestroika, allowing a multi-party system, and the total implementation of the Universal Declaration of Human Rights in all party and government affairs.

In subsequent months the activists led by 13 democracy leaders including Tsakhiagiin Elbegdorj, Sanjaasürengiin Zorig, Erdeniin Bat-Üül, Bat-Erdeniin Batbayar and others continued to organize demonstrations, rallies, protests and hunger strikes, as well as teachers' and workers' strikes. The activists had growing support from Mongolians, both in the capital and the countryside and the union's activities led to other calls for democracy all over the country.

On 2 January 1990, Mongolian Democratic Union began distributing leaflets calling for a democratic revolution. When the government did not comply with this and later, more aggressive demands, demonstrations occurred. On January 14, 1990, some 1000 protesters met on square in front of Lenin Museum which has been renamed as Freedom Square since then in Ulaanbaatar. A demonstration on Sükhbaatar Square on 21 January (in weather of -30 C) followed. Protestors carried banners alluding to Chinggis Khaan (also referred to Genghis Khan), rehabilitating a figure which Soviet schooling neglected to praise. They celebrated Daramyn Tömör-Ochir, a politician who was purged from the MPRP in 1962 as part of the MPRP's efforts to suppress the commemoration of the 800th anniversary of Genghis Khan's birth. And the rebels carried a modified Flag of Mongolia which lacked a star symbolizing socialism; this flag would become the new flag after the revolution.

After numerous demonstrations of many thousands of people in the capital city as well as provincial centers, on 4 March 1990, the MDU and three other reform organizations held a joint outdoor mass meeting, inviting the government to attend. The government sent no representative to what became a demonstration of over 100,000 people demanding democratic change. Ten members of the organizations began a hunger strike on 7 March, the next day,  Mongolian People's Revolutionary Party(MPRP) (present Mongolian People's Party)'s Politburo – the authority of the government eventually gave way to the pressure and entered negotiations with the leaders of the democratic movement Mongolian Democratic Union. Jambyn Batmönkh, chairman of Politburo of MPRP's Central Committee decided to dissolve the Politburo and to resign on 9 March 1990. This paved the way for the first multi-party elections in Mongolia.

Behind the scenes, however, the MPRP had seriously considered cracking down on the protesters, writing a decree that was left to be signed by the party leader Jambyn Batmönkh. Batmönkh opposed it, maintaining a strict policy of never using force. People those were present there later recalled that Batmönkh said "I will never sign this. We few Mongols have not yet come to the point that we will make each other's noses bleed," smacked the table, and left the room."

Elbegdorj announced the news of the Politburo resignation to the hunger strikers and to people who'd gathered on Sükhbaatar Square at 10PM on that day after the negotiations between leaders of MPRP and Mongolian Democratic Union. Then the hunger strike stopped.

In April, the conflict worsened, with the government restricting the freedom of assembly and the democracy leaders submitting an ultimatum demanding equal participation of all political groups. The Communist party refused to accede to the demands. However, in May, under pressure and after negotiations with members of the opposition movement, the People's Great Hural approved the Law on Political Parties.

Multi-party system
Following the collapse of the Communist regime, Mongolia's first free, multi-party elections for a bicameral parliament were held on July 29, 1990. Parties ran for 430 seats in the Great Hural, with opposition parties not able to nominate enough candidates. The Mongolian People's Revolutionary Party MPRP won 357 seats, an 83% majority.  It also received a majority in the Small Hural (which was later abolished), winning 31 out of 53. The State Great Hural (upper house) first met on 3 September and elected a president (MPRP), vice president (Social Democrat), prime minister (MPRP), and 50 members to the Baga Hural (lower house). The vice president was also chairman of the Baga Hural. In November 1991, the People's Great Hural (Parliament) began discussion on a new constitution, which entered into force on 12 February 1992. In addition to establishing Mongolia as an independent, sovereign republic and guaranteeing a number of rights and freedoms, the new constitution restructured the legislative branch of government, creating a unicameral legislature, the State Great Hural (SGH).

Nonetheless, the new MPRP government under Dashiin Byambasüren shared power with the democrats, and implemented constitutional and economic reforms, with a new constitution being adopted in 1992. In early and mid-1990s, with the collapse of the Soviet Union, which had until 1990 provided significant economic aid to Mongolia's state budget, the country experienced harsh economic problems as early as the 1980s. Foreign trade broke down, economic and technical aid from the former socialist countries ended, and domestic economy was struggling with privatization. Inflation rose, stores' shelves were depleted, ration cards for food were issued for a period of time. A thriving black market arose in Ulaanbaatar by 1988 to accommodate the needs of the populace.

New governance in democracy
The constitution was amended in 1992. In the same year, the MPRP won another round of parliamentary elections. The new constitution also provided that the president would be elected by popular vote rather than by the legislature as before. Incumbent Punsalmaagin Ochirbat became Mongolia's first universally elected president winning the 1993 Mongolian presidential election with two thirds of the vote. Originally an MPRP member, Ochirbat ran as the candidate of the democratic opposition, after the MPRP had nominated an orthodox communist as their candidate. The MPRP was defeated for the first time in its history.

In 1996 Mongolian parliamentary elections, the Democratic Union won the legislative elections for the first time co-led by Tsakhiagiin Elbegdorj as the chairman of Democratic Party. The MPRP lost the majority for the first time. 
MPRP candidate Natsagiin Bagabandi became elected as president in 1997, and re-elected in 2001.

In parliamentary elections of 2000, 2004, and 2008, the MPRP won the legislative elections and was the ruling party between these periods. 2004 election results forced the MPRP to join a coalition government with the Motherland Democratic Coalition, a coalition of the Democratic Party (Mongolia), the Civic Will Party, and the Motherland Party. The MPRP left the coalition in January 2006, however, proceeded to create a government on its own. Another government reshuffle took place at the end of 2007, when the MPRP decided to replace its prime minister Miyeegombyn Enkhbold with Sanjaagiin Bayar. MPRP formed a coalition government with the Democratic Party in 2008 also, although the MPRP won the majority being blamed for vote rigging and followed riots.

In 2009 Mongolian Presidential election, Democratic Party candidate Tsakhiagiin Elbegdorj defeated MPRP candidate incumbent President Nambaryn Enkhbayar. In January 2012, Democratic Party made a decision to leave the coalition government before upcoming parliamentary elections in June. Following Democratic Party's victory in 2009 Presidential election, in 2012 Parliamentary elections Democratic Party won. In 2012 local elections of the capital city, provinces, districts Mongolian People's Party (former MPRP) was defeated for the first time in the country's history. In 2013 Mongolian Presidential election, Democratic Party candidate incumbent President Tsakhiagiin Elbegdorj won. Thus the Democratic Party stemming from Mongolian Democratic Union-the pro-democracy activists has been on the power of Mongolia's presidency, parliament and government since 2012.

MPP won a landslide victory both 2016 and 2020 election. However, before the 2020 election, the ruling party had redrawn the electoral map in a way beneficial to MPP: After Prime Minister Ukhnaagiin Khürelsükh of MPP, in office since 2016, had resigned after protests over the treatment of a coronavirus patient, Luvsannamsrai Oyun-Erdeneo of MPP became new prime minister on 27 January 2021. He represented a younger generation of leaders that had studied abroad., Khaltmaa Battulga, the candidate of opposition Democratic party, has been the President of Mongolia since 2017, after winning the presidential election.

See also
Timeline of Mongolian history

References 

 
20th century in Mongolia
Mongolia